Record A.E.B.E. (brand also spelled in Greek as Ρεκόρ) was the name of a Greek company producing agricultural machinery and vehicles, founded in Heraklion, Crete in 1957 and dissolved in 1999. Its products have included walking tractors (since 1958), a family of characteristic Greek three-wheel vehicles combining truck and tractor functions (since 1966), "proper" tractors (since 1970) and four-wheel trucks (since 1978); mechanical equipment like clutches and gearboxes for use in its vehicles were also produced. Its main market was Greece, although some of its walking tractors were also exported. Annual vehicle production in the late 1970s and early 1980s averaged 500 units.

The most advanced models were the 1970 ΓΣ 7 tractor, which used 18-26 hp Ruggerini Diesel engines, and the 1980 GS 2000 truck, which used a 1,400 cc, 55 hp Peugeot Diesel engine. This fibreglass-bodied truck could carry two tonnes and featured a cab design clearly influenced by those of contemporary Japanese models, in particular the first generation Mitsubishi Delica.

References 

L.S. Skartsis, "Greek Vehicle & Machine Manufacturers 1800 to present: A Pictorial History", Marathon (2012)  (eBook)
 E. Roupa and E. Hekimoglou, "I istoria tou aftokinitou stin Ellada (History of automobile in Greece)", Kerkyra - Economia publishing, Athens (2009) 

Agricultural machinery manufacturers of Greece
Tractor manufacturers of Greece
Motor vehicle manufacturers of Greece
1999 disestablishments in Greece
Defunct motor vehicle manufacturers of Greece